Epihipparch is an Ancient Greek military title for a cavalry commander of 1,000 horses. They were powerful and respected. This unit was divided into two hipparchiai of 500. Each of these was commanded by a hipparchos.

Military ranks of ancient Greece